Below is a list of people who are known for their association with Attock. It does not necessarily mean that they were born in the city or were even nationals of the country.

Military personnel 
Major Shaukat Hayat Khan
Captain Asfandyar Bukhari
Lt. General Javed Ashraf Qazi
Air Marshal Malik Nur Khan

Politicians 
 Malik Hakmeen Khan, politician
 Tahir Sadiq Khan, politician
 Sheikh Aftab Ahmed, politician
 Malik Amin Aslam, politician
 Shuja Khanzada, politician
 Malik Allahyar Khan, politician
 Malik Ihtebar Khan, politician
 Muhammad Zain Elahi, politician

Landlord 
 Malik Ata Muhammad Khan

Sports 
 Nizakat Khan, cricketer
 Shabana Latif, female cricketer from Attock.
 Qadeer Ahmed, cricketer
 Ehsan Nawaz, cricketer
 Babar Hayat, cricketer who plays for Hong Kong, and is the first Hong Kong player to score a century in a T20I match.
 Haider Ali, cricketer

References

Attock